See Echelon (disambiguation) for similarly spelled alternatives.

Eschelon Telecom was a Minneapolis, MN based company founded in 1996 by its chairman, Cliff Williams, as Advanced Telecommunications, Inc., a holding company for telecommunications businesses. Eschelon provides service in Minnesota, Colorado, California, Nevada, Washington, Oregon, Arizona, Utah and Montana.

In April 2000, it was unified under the single name of Eschelon Telecom, Inc.

In March 2007, Integra Telecom signed a definitive agreement to purchase Eschelon for $710M USD in cash and debt repayment.

References

External links
Official Website

Defunct companies based in Minneapolis
1996 establishments in Minnesota